Mitella pentandra, or Pectiantia pentandra, is a species of flowering plant in the Saxifrage Family (Saxifragaceae), known by the common names fivestamen miterwort or five-point bishop's cap.

Range and habitat
Mitella pentandra is native to much of western North America from Alaska to California to Colorado, where it grows in moist, shady habitat such as meadows, woods, and mountain forests.

Description
The leaves have oval blades several centimeters wide with edges divided into toothed lobes, and occur mostly around the base of the stem.

The erect inflorescence bears several flowers, sometimes up to 25, usually along one side of the stem. The distinctive flower is saucer-shaped with five green petals which are divided into narrow, whiskerlike lobes.

References

External links
Jepson Manual Treatment
Photo gallery

pentandra
Flora of Alaska
Flora of Western Canada
Flora of the Western United States
Flora without expected TNC conservation status